Aleksa Marković (born 27 February 1997) is a Canadian soccer player playing with Canadian Soccer League club BGHC 1.

Club career
Born in Hamilton, Ontario, Markovic began playing in 2015 with Brantford Galaxy in the Canadian Soccer League. He later started playing with FK Zemun debuting as senior with one appearance in the 2015–16 Serbian First League. Next season he spent on loans, first half at FK Radnički Beograd playing in the Serbian League Belgrade, and second half with FK Brodarac 1947 playing in same league. In summer 2017, he was registered for his club, Zemun, which had just had been promoted to the Serbian SuperLiga, and he made his debut in the Serbian highest rank on August 5, 2017, in a game against FK Radnički Niš. 

In 2019, he played in the Bayernliga Süd with Türkspor Augsburg. He returned to his former club Brantford Galaxy for the 2020 season. In late 2020, he signed with FK Zvijezda 09 of the First League of the Republika Srpska, and made his debut on October 11, 2020 against FK Tekstilac Derventa. After the merger between Hamilton City, and Brantford Galaxy he played with BGH City FC for the 2021 CSL season. In late 2021, he played at the college level with Mohawk College.

International career
Markovic was part of Canada men's national under-20 soccer team camp in January 2017 in Toronto.

References

External links
Aleksa Marković at Footballdatabase

1997 births
Living people
Soccer players from Hamilton, Ontario
Canadian people of Serbian descent
Canadian soccer players
Canadian expatriate soccer players
Association football midfielders
Association football forwards
Brantford Galaxy players
FK Zemun players
FK Radnički Beograd players
FK Inđija players
FK Zvijezda 09 players
Canadian Soccer League (1998–present) players
First League of the Republika Srpska players
Serbian First League players
Serbian SuperLiga players
Expatriate footballers in Serbia
Expatriate footballers in Germany
Canadian expatriate sportspeople in Serbia
Canadian expatriate sportspeople in Germany
Serbian League players